Hermann Heller (28 January 1850, in Lucerne – 25 June 1917) was a Swiss politician, mayor of Lucerne, member of the Swiss National Council (1891–1917) and its president in 1899 (June–December).

External links

1850 births
1917 deaths
People from Lucerne
Free Democratic Party of Switzerland politicians
Members of the National Council (Switzerland)
Presidents of the National Council (Switzerland)
Mayors of places in Switzerland